"Aberystwyth" is a hymn tune composed by Joseph Parry, written in 1876 and first published in 1879 in Edward Stephen's Ail Lyfr Tonau ac Emynau (Welsh for Second Book of Tunes and Hymns). Parry was at the time the  first professor and head of the new department of music at the recently founded University College Wales, Aberystwyth, now called Aberystwyth University.

History
The tune "Aberystwyth" has been the most popular setting for Charles Wesley's hymn "Jesus, Lover of My Soul".

Legacy
Some claim the melody of South Africa's former anthem, Nkosi Sikelel' iAfrika, is derived from this hymn, while others have called the connection far fetched.

Music

Gallery

References

Compositions by Joseph Parry
Hymn tunes
Aberystwyth
National symbols of Tanzania
National symbols of Zambia
National symbols of South Africa
1879 songs